Abdallah Abdelrahman Dagou (born 21 September 2000) is a Libyan professional footballer who plays as a midfielder for Tunisian club Étoile du Sahel and the Libya national team.

Club career
Dagou signed with Étoile du Sahel on 21 October 2018. He made his professional debut with Étoile du Sahel in a 2–0 Tunisian Ligue Professionnelle 1 win over Tataouine on 9 August 2020.

International career
Dagou debuted for the senior Libya national team in a 2–1 friendly loss to Comoros on 11 October 2020.

References

External links
 

2000 births
Living people
Libyan footballers
Association football midfielders
Libya international footballers
Tunisian Ligue Professionnelle 1 players
Étoile Sportive du Sahel players
Libyan expatriate footballers
Libyan expatriate sportspeople in Tunisia
Expatriate footballers in Tunisia